The 1964–65 Yugoslav Second League season was the 19th season of the Second Federal League, the second level association football competition of SFR Yugoslavia, since its establishment in 1946. The league was contested in two regional groups (West Division and East Division), with 16 clubs each.

West Division

Teams
A total of sixteen teams contested the league, including thirteen sides from the 1963–64 season and three sides promoted from the third tier leagues played in the 1963–64 season. The league was contested in a double round robin format, with each club playing every other club twice, for a total of 30 rounds. Two points were awarded for wins and one point for draws.

There were no teams relegated from the 1963–64 Yugoslav First League as the 14th placed Vardar was allowed to remain in the top level. The three clubs promoted to the second level were Kladivar, Rudar Kakanj and RNK Split.

League table

East Division

Teams
A total of sixteen teams contested the league, including twelve sides from the 1963–64 season, one club relegated from the 1963–64 Yugoslav First League and three sides promoted from the third tier leagues played in the 1963–64 season. The league was contested in a double round robin format, with each club playing every other club twice, for a total of 30 rounds. Two points were awarded for wins and one point for draws.

Novi Sad were relegated from the 1963–64 Yugoslav First League after finishing in the 13th place of the league table. The three clubs promoted to the second level were Bregalnica Štip, Mladost and Voždovački.

League table

See also
1964–65 Yugoslav First League
1964–65 Yugoslav Cup

Yugoslav Second League seasons
Yugo
2